Paulino Ferrer (9 December 1926 – 27 April 2013) was a Venezuelan hurdler. He competed in the men's 400 metres hurdles at the 1952 Summer Olympics.

References

External links
 

1926 births
2013 deaths
Athletes (track and field) at the 1952 Summer Olympics
Venezuelan male hurdlers
Olympic athletes of Venezuela
People from Cabimas